The dog king is a Scandinavian tradition which appears in several Scandinavian sources: Chronicon Lethrense, Annals of Lund, Gesta Danorum (book 7), Heimskringla (Hákonar saga góða), Hversu Noregr byggðist and probably also in Skáldatal.

The Chronicon Lethrense and Annals of Lund tell that on the death of the 6th-century Danish king Halga, the Swedish King Eadgils sent a small dog to the Danes to take as their king but warned that whoever told him of the death of the dog would lose his life. One day, when larger dogs were fighting, the small dog sprang to the floor among them and was torn to death. Then Læ, the giant of Læsø, gave some advice on the matter to his herdsman Snow. Snow went to the Swedish king's court and by riddling talk eventually got the king himself to say that the dog was dead. Snow was then appointed king of Denmark in place of the dog. Snow was a vicious, oppressive, and dishonest king. Snow sent his servant named Roth "Red", whom he disliked, to the giant Læ to ask about how Snow will die, intending that Læ would kill Roth who would be unable to pass his tests. Roth passed and Læ gave Roth two gloves to take to Snow in answer. Snow put them on in an assembly and lice suddenly attacked him and ate him to death. Thereupon Halga's son Hrólfr kraki was made king.

In Gesta Danorum, book 7, Saxo Grammaticus tells of a Gunnar, "the bravest of the Swedes" who invaded Norway and relished killing rather than pillaging. In order to humiliate the Norwegians after his victory against their aged king Ragnald, he appointed a dog as their ruler. He then appointed governors to take care of affairs of state in the name of the dog, and several ranks of nobles to watch over it. He also commanded that if anyone failed to show the dog respect, he was to be mutilated.

Hversu Noregr byggðist and Hákonar saga góða refer to a king named Eysteinn Illráði who had a dog as subking. Whereas Hversu only mentions the tale in passing Hákonar saga góða retells it in more detail. It is said that when King Eysteinn of Oppland (Eysteinn Upplendingakonungr or Eysteinn hinn illi) conquered Trondheim, he set his son Onund to rule them. When the people killed Onund, he subdued the area again, and offered the people either his slave, who was called Thorer Faxe, or his dog Saurr (or Saur, a name which means "excrement"), to be their new king. They chose the dog, as they thought they would be rid of him sooner. For three years Saurr was treated regally, with a collar of gold, courtiers, a throne, and a mansion - and routinely signed paw-print decrees - until one day wolves broke into his fold and tore him to pieces.

Skáldatal mentions that a skald named Erpr lútandi was sentenced to death for killing in a sanctuary. He saved his life by composing a drápa for Saurr the dog king. This Erpr was the skald of the Swedish king Eysteinn hinn illráði, which puts the events in the early 9th century.

That a Saurr dog king appears in the context of two kings named Eysteinn (hinn) illráði who lived in Oppland and Uppland respectively is probably not a coincidence. A similar confusion took place when the Swedish king Onela became Áli of Norwegian Oppland (instead of Swedish Uppland).

See also
 Incitatus

References

External links
 Hakon the Good's Saga at Northvegr
 Peter Tunstall's translation of the Chronicon lethrense at The Chronicle of the Kings of Lejre and Northvegr: The Saga of Hrolf Kraki: The Chronicle of the Kings of Lejre.
Book seven of Gesta Danorum at the Medieval and Classical Literature Library
Skáldatal Old Norse text
Sacred Texts: Appendix A: Fl. Book 1.21,22: How Norway was inhabited a translation of Hversu Noregr byggðist. (The genealogies of the descendants of Nór and the Ættartolur are not translated here.)

Animals in Norse mythology
Germanic legends
Mythological archetypes
Mythological dogs
Mythological kings of Denmark
Norse mythology